The Central Line, formerly known as the Tanganyika Railway is the most important railway line in Tanzania, apart from TAZARA. It runs west from Dar es Salaam to Kigoma on Lake Tanganyika via Dodoma. A branch leads to Mwanza on Lake Victoria.

In 2017, Tanzania began the Tanzania Standard Gauge Railway project, which will construct a standard gauge (1435 mm) line parallel to the meter-gauge (1000 mm) Central Line between Dar es Salaam and Mwanza, with a new route branching northwest at Isaka to Kigali in Rwanda.

History

German period 
The Central Line was the second railway project coming into existence in the colony of then German East Africa after the Usambara Railway. For the Tanganjikabahn-project a company was founded, the Ostafrikanische Eisenbahngesellschaft (OAEG) (East African Railway Company) which started railway construction in 1905 with 21 million marks (ℳ) provided by Adolph von Hansemann's Disconto-Gesellschaft (Discounting Company) bank. The building started at the port and capital of that time, Dar es Salaam.

From the start the engineers fought large difficulties, the tropical climate, periodic heavy rain and lack of appropriate building material. On the other hand, they could count on the experiences from the previous building of the Usambara Railway. The , meter-gauge, was chosen. The Central Line is the largest technical inheritance of the German colonial age in Tanzania.

The route followed an old caravan route to Tabora, which gave large logistic advantages. German settlers soon followed with plantations, and Tabora developed into a large agricultural centre. Kilometer 200 was reached in 1907, in the vicinity of the town of Morogoro. In 1909 the railhead reached Kilosa. Kigoma at Lake Tanganyika at kilometer 1252 was reached in 1914 just prior to the First World War. The regular travel time over the total distance amounted to 58 hours. It was planned to develop the line further to Iringa and to reach Lake Malawi, a project which was stopped due to the war.

The construction of the line opened up trade between Lake Tanganyika and the east coast and spurred the growth of the ports at its termini.

British Mandate 
The British mandate added to the Central Line three branch lines. Another ran from Kilosa to Mikumi. A third, established in 1931, ran from Manyoni to Kiniyangiri; this had been shut down by 1948.

After independence 
After the independence of Tanzania, the Central Line and the Usambara Railway were connected between the stations of Mruazi and Ruvu.

The Main Line 
The Central Line starts at the Tanzanian metropolis of Dar es Salaam at the Indian Ocean with today's capital of Tanzania, Dodoma, in the center of the country and proceeds further to Tanzania’s most important port at the shore of Lake Tanganyika, Kigoma. The main stations on this line are: Dar es Salaam, Ruvu, Morogoro, Kilosa, Dodoma, Manyoni, Tabora and Kaliua.

Mwanza Line 

The Mwanza Railway line connects with the main line at Tabora station and ends at Mwanza railway station. The distance covered by this railway line is 378 km. Its construction started at Tabora in 1923 and ended in Mwanza in 1928. A dry port was constructed at the town of Isaka, for freight transport to Rwanda and Burundi. The main stations along the Mwanza Railway line are: Tabora, Kakola, Isaka, Shinyanga and Mwanza.

Mikumi line 
The Mikumi line, built between 1958 and 1963, branches southwards off the Central Line at Kilosa and crosses the Mkata Plain to Kidatu, where it meets the 1,067 mm gauge TAZARA Railway at a break-of-gauge.

Traffic 

Today’s railservices are offered by the Tanzania Railways Corporation. The timetable offers two passenger services per week in each direction covering the whole length of the line. A trip from Dar es Salam to Kigoma takes approximately 40 hours today according to the timetable. The long time of travel is due to the poor state of the railway’s infrastructure, which originates to a large extent still from the German colonial times. Three classes are offered, whereby the second class also provides sleeping cars and the first class offers sleeping cars only. The standard of a sleeping car of second class corresponds rather to a couchette by European standards.

Flooding in December 2009 caused serious disruption; operations resumed in June 2010.

See also 

 History of rail transport in Tanzania
 Rail transport in Tanzania
 Railway stations in Tanzania

Sources

Literature 
 Franz Balzer: Die Kolonialbahnen mit besonderer Berücksichtigung Afrikas. Berlin 1916. Reprint: Leipzig 2008. .
 Helmut Schroeter: Die Eisenbahnen der ehemaligen deutschen Schutzgebiete Afrikas und ihre Fahrzeuge = Die Fahrzeuge der deutschen Eisenbahnen 7. Frankfurt 1961.

External links 
 Interior of a 1st class passenger car of the Tanganjikabahn previous to 1918
 Construction of the Central Line.

Maps 
 UN map
 Interactive map of Tanzania railways

Economy of German East Africa
Night trains
Metre gauge railways in Tanzania
Railway lines in Tanzania